Churuquita Chiquita is a town in the Coclé province of Panama. At 166 meters above sea level it is located in Churuquita Chiquita and has 1,142 inhabitants according to the 2010 census.

References

Sources 
World Gazeteer: Panama – World-Gazetteer.com

Populated places in Coclé Province